Arthur Kobus (9 February 1879 – April 1945) was a German general during the Second World War.

Biography
Arthur Kobus was born on 9 February 1879, in Metz, Alsace-Lorraine. Kobus fought during the First World War, with the rank of Officer. 
He followed his career in the Reichswehr, then in the Heer, the German army. During the Second World War, Arthur Kobus served in many significant military assignments, and participated in a few military operations. He eventually attained the rank of Generalleutnant on 1 July 1942. In April 1945, General Kobus committed suicide in Berlin, rather than surrender to the Red Army.

Decorations
 Eisernes Kreuz

Sources
 Generale der Reichswehr und Wehrmacht mit K on lexikon-der-wehrmacht.de

1879 births
1945 deaths
German military personnel who committed suicide
Military personnel from Metz
Lieutenant generals of the German Army (Wehrmacht)
People from Alsace-Lorraine
Reichswehr personnel
Recipients of the Iron Cross (1914), 1st class
Suicides in Germany